Ek Villain Returns is a 2022 Indian Hindi-language action thriller film written and directed by Mohit Suri. It is a sequel to his 2014 film Ek Villain. The film stars John Abraham, Arjun Kapoor, Disha Patani and Tara Sutaria. 

The film was released theatrically on 29 July 2022 and opened to mixed reviews from critics and performed badly at the box office.

Plot 
A masked intruder barges into an apartment complex, where he attacks and kills a singer named Aarvi Malhotra. The cops, headed by ex-CBI officer and DCP Aditya Rathore, deduce that the attack was orchestrated by Gautam Mehra, who is the son of businessman Divesh Mehra, and arrest him.

Flashback: Gautam is a spoilt brat, who is berated by Divesh for having created a commotion at his ex-girlfriend Siya's wedding. The commotion video has been made into a rap song by singer Aarvi. Gautam is ousted from the business and his house. Pretending to be in love with her, he helps her scare away her rival Q/Kiran. Aarvi falls for Gautam and reveals that her biological father Balkrishnan Shastri, a popular singer, had an extramarital affair with her mother, but never accepted either of them. Her main goal is to make her father accept her as his daughter by becoming a famous singer and then reject him. Gautam leaks Aarvi's childhood photos, implying that he was out to get even with her for humiliating him, and Shastri publicly rejects his daughter. Aarvi is heartbroken. Three months after the breakup, when Gautam gets attacked by Siya's husband Aditya, and Aarvi takes care of him, he realizes his love for her. He pleads with her to give him a second chance, but Aarvi leaves him, albeit with a heavy heart. 

Present: Gautam escapes from the cops. Ganesan surmises that Gautam hasn't killed Aarvi. The cops interrogate Bhairav Purohit, whom Aarvi had called from her phone, the day she was murdered, but he denies committing the crime and there is no evidence either. Ganesan determines a pattern, that the killer only targets young girls with one-sided lovers, after discovering that 18 girls have been murdered with a similar modus operandi in the past 6 months. The ensuing circumstances motivate Ganesan to conclude that Gautam is not the serial killer, and it is later revealed that the serial killer is, in fact, Bhairav; Gautam fights him but is unable to see his face, which allows Bhairav to escape.  

Flashback: Bhairav is a cab driver who works part-time as a zookeeper along with his widower friend Keshav, who has a son Yash, but ignores him for random girls he brings to the zoo. He meets Rasika Mapuskar, a retail salesgirl at a mall, falls deeply in love with her, and harbors plans for marriage. One day, Rasika injures a group of rogues that were eve-teasing her, which reveals her dark side to Bhairav. The day Bhairav decides to propose to Rasika, he witnesses her getting intimate with her married manager Atul, and is heartbroken. Rasika subsequently instigates him to kill girls who don't reciprocate the feelings of their respective boyfriends. Bhairav is mentally tormented and starts murdering dozens of girls. On the day Aarvi leaves Gautam, she turns out to be traveling in Bhairav's cab; Bhairav misunderstands that she has dumped Gautam, and attacks her.

Present: Gautam learns about Bhairav's zoo address and leaves to confront him. Ganesan is killed by Bhairav, who reveals that Aarvi is alive. She tries to escape the zoo where she had been kept by Bhairav but he catches her and locks her in an underground cage. Just as Gautam and Bhairav are about to fight, the police come and detain Bhairav. They interrogate Yash, who frames Keshav in an attempt to defend Bhairav. The police also investigate the crime scene, where a girl's dead body is found inside the freezer, though it is not Aarvi. 

Outside the station, Gautam sees Bhairav and Rasika hugging. Later that evening, both return to the zoo and attend to Aarvi's cage; Aarvi regains consciousness and stabs Bhairav with a glass shard that she found there. Rasika bursts into laughter while Bhairav attacks Aarvi. Gautam arrives to save her, and a fight ensues between the guys. Bhairav hits Gautam, who falls to the ground, and demands Rasika's reaction, but at this point, Gautam begins laughing and asks who and where "Rasika" is: in a shocking twist, it turns out that Bhairav was hallucinating her all along. Bhairav then reminisces that Rasika told him how Atul was planning to ditch his family for her; he had, in fact, inadvertently killed Rasika by cracking her back while begging her not to leave him. The body the cops found in the freezer is revealed to be Rasika's, which Bhairav kept for himself. He drops to the ground in dismay while Gautam and Aarvi reconcile. Realizing his mistake, Bhairav walks inside the cage of the tiger only to meet the same fate as his victims. Aarvi can be seen singing at her concert with the support of her fans and Gautam.

During a mid-credits scene, at a mental asylum, Rakesh Mahadkar, who has survived the accident and became paraplegic meets Bhairav, who has lost an eye due to the tiger attack. Rakesh Mahadkar goes into Bhairav's room to unplug Bhairav's medication and machines and recites his promise from the prequel and Bhairav wakes up just before the screen cuts to black.

Cast 
 John Abraham as Bhairav Purohit
 Arjun Kapoor as Gautam Mehra
 Disha Patani as Rasika Mapuskar
 Tara Sutaria as Aarvi Malhotra
 J. D. Chakravarthy as ACP V. K. Ganesan
 Karishma Sharma as Siya, Gautam's ex-girlfriend(cameo)
 Kaizaad Kotwal as Siya's Father
 Elena Roxana Maria Fernandes as Qiran
 Shaad Randhawa as ex-CBI officer DCP Aditya Rathore
 Bharat Dabholkar as Divesh Mehra, Gautam's father
 Ivan Rodrigues as Thapar
 Digvijay Rohildas as Keshav Rane, Bhairav's friend
 Neha Shitole as Chetna
 Satish Nakyodi as Satish
 Riteish Deshmukh in archived footage appearance and a mid-credits cameo appearance as Rakesh Mahadkar
 Badshah as himself in a cameo appearance in the song "Shaamat"

Production

Casting
Aditya Roy Kapur was originally signed for the role portrayed by Arjun Kapoor, but later backed out due to creative differences with director Mohit Suri. Then, Kartik Aaryan was approached but he could not accept the offer due to date clashes with his Dhamaka.

Filming
Principal photography began on 1 March 2021. Abraham finished shooting in October 2021. The entire film was wrapped up on 24 March 2022.

Soundtrack 

The songs are composed by Ankit Tiwari, Tanishk Bagchi, and Kaushik-Guddu. The lyrics are written by Manoj Muntashir,  Kunaal Vermaa, Tanishk Bagchi and Prince Dubey. The film score is composed by Raju Singh.

The first song "Galliyan Returns" was recreated from the track Galliyan for the 2014 film Ek Villain which was sung by Ankit Tiwari and written by Manoj Muntashir. The second single named "Dil" was released on 8 July 2022. The third single titled "Shaamat" was released on 16 July 2022 with Tara Sutaria making her singing debut. The fourth single titled "Naa Tere Bin" was released on 22 July 2022.

Reception

Box office 
Ek Villain Returns earned 7.05 crores at the domestic box office on its opening day. On the second day, the film collected 7.47 crore. On the third day, the film collected 9.02 crore, taking a total domestic weekend collection to 23.54 crore.

Critical response 
Ek Villain Returns received mixed reviews from critics.
A critic for Bollywood Hungama rated the  film 4 out of 5 stars and wrote "EK VILLAIN RETURNS is the epitome of supreme music, amazing visuals and thrilling moments". Shweta Keshri of India Today  rated the film 3 out of 5 stars and wrote "The gripping plot of Ek Villain Returns is the winner with an engaging storyline. Mohit Suri, who did a good job with the first film of the Ek Villain franchise, brings a masala entertainer with massy dialogues, thrilling moments and good performances in the sequel". Rohit Bhatnagar of The Free Press Journal rated the film 3 out of 5 stars and wrote "Ek Villain Returns has surely returned but not with the vibe of the earlier one. Enjoy this film to experience a stylish thriller that copes well with the mass appeal". Rachana Dubey of The Times of India rated the film 2.5 out of 5 stars and wrote "Ek Villain Returns dishes out plenty of twists and turns but doesn't make you emotionally cheer for any of the characters or the story, though you wish the situation was different". Nandini Ramnath of Scroll.in rated the film 2 out of 5 stars and wrote "Heads are bludgeoned and the blood flows throughout Ek Villain Returns, but there's nothing more frightening than the valourisation of misogyny". Avinash Lohana of Pinkvilla rated the film 2 out of 5 stars and wrote "Ek Villain Returns was a promising entertainer, but it is the overall story that proves to be a bummer". 

Sonil Dedhia of News 18 rated the film 1.5 out of 5 stars and wrote "Ek Villain Returns kicks in only after the interval, and then it becomes the film it should have been from the get-go. The first half is a waste, even if it tries hard to get the audience invested into the characters who say dialogues which are straight out of '80s Bollywood". Shubhra Gupta of The Indian Express rated the film 1 out of 5 stars and wrote "Disha Patani, Tara Sutaria, Arjun Kapoor, John Abraham-starrer has a disjointed plot and pedestrian performances, which makes Ek Villain look like a better film". Saibal Chatterjee of NDTV rated the film 1 out of 5 stars and wrote "Arjun Kapoor and John Abraham outdo each other in matching the vacuity of the film. As for Tara Sutaria and Disha Patani, the less said the better". Anna M.M. Vetticad of Firstpost rated the film 0.5 out of 5 stars and wrote "John Abraham barely alters his expression throughout Ek Villain Returns. His co-stars do the best they can in what can only be described as dismal circumstances". Sukanya Vema of Rediff rated the film 0.5 out of 5 stars and wrote "Ek Villain Returns falls back on the popularity of the Galliyan track to boost its appeal".

Release

Theatrical
The film was released in theatres worldwide on 29 July 2022.

Home media
The digital streaming rights of the film was sold to Netflix. The film started streaming digitally on Netflix from 9 September 2022.

References

External links 
 

2022 films
2020s Hindi-language films
2022 action thriller films
Films scored by Ankit Tiwari
Films scored by Mithoon
Indian films about revenge
Indian action thriller films
Indian nonlinear narrative films
Fictional portrayals of the Maharashtra Police
Balaji Motion Pictures films
Indian serial killer films
Films directed by Mohit Suri
2020s serial killer films